Arbnora de Leoni ( Robelli; born 3 September 1992) is a Kosovo Albanian former footballer and currently a padel player who represents Kosovo.

International career
De Leoni was part of the inaugural Albania women's national team in 2011, where she received a call up in November for a friendly against Macedonia. She was part of Albania for six years where she played in eighteen matches and scored two goals, her last international match was on 28 November 2017 against Switzerland in Biel/Bienne.

Personal life
De Leoni was born in Norway to Kosovo Albanian parents from Gjilan, where after her birth they moved to Sweden. Her brother Arbër also played football. She also has a bachelor's degree in social psychology and was a contestant on Miss World Sweden 2012, where she reached the last 32, along with four other Swedish Albanian contestants.

References

External links

1992 births
Living people
Albanian women's footballers
Albania women's international footballers
Kosovan women's footballers
Swedish women's footballers
Swedish people of Kosovan descent
Swedish people of Albanian descent
Women's association football forwards